Gymnothorax ocellatus is a moray eel found in coral reefs in the western Atlantic Ocean. It was first named by Louis Agassiz in 1831, and is also commonly known as the blackedge moray, Caribbean ocellated moray, conger, ocellated moray, spotted moray, sawtooth moray, white-spotted moray, or yellow cong.

References

ocellatus
Fish described in 1831